The Seattle Sea Dragons (formerly known as the Seattle Dragons) are a professional American football team based in Seattle, Washington. The team was founded by Vince McMahon’s Alpha Entertainment and is an owned-and-operated member of the new XFL owned by Dwayne Johnson’s Alpha Acquico. The Sea Dragons play their home games at Lumen Field.

History

McMahon Era (2020)
On December 5, 2018, Seattle was announced as one of eight cities that would join the newly reformed XFL, as well as St. Louis, Houston, Los Angeles, New York, DC, Tampa Bay, and Dallas. Former Seahawks quarterback Jim Zorn, who was the first quarterback to start for the Seahawks, was named the team's first head coach on February 25, 2019. The team name and logo were revealed on August 21, 2019, as well as the team's uniforms on December 3, 2019.

On October 15, 2019, The Dragons announced their first player in team history, being assigned former Memphis Express Quarterback Brandon Silvers.

The Dragons won their first game in team history on February 16, 2020, defeating the Tampa Bay Vipers 17-9. On March 12, 2020, The XFL announced that the remainder of the 2020 XFL season had been cancelled due to the COVID-19 pandemic. The team finished with a 1-4 record. On April 10, 2020, The XFL suspended operations, with all employees, players and staff being terminated.

Dwayne Johnson and Dany Garcia Era (2023-present) 
On August 3, 2020, it was reported that a consortium led by Dwayne "The Rock" Johnson, Dany Garcia, and Gerry Cardinale (through Cardinale's fund RedBird Capital Partners) purchased the XFL for $15 million just hours before an auction could take place; the purchase received court approval on August 7, 2020. The XFL hired Jim Haslett as a Head Coach on April 13, 2022, with the expectation that he would be coaching the Seattle team. On July 24, 2022, the return of a Seattle XFL franchise was confirmed, as well as the hiring of Jim Haslett. On October 31, 2022, The XFL officially announced that the Dragons would be changing their name to "Sea Dragons", as well as a brand new logo.

Market overview 
The Sea Dragons are one of multiple professional sports teams located in Seattle, including the Seattle Mariners, Seattle Seahawks, Seattle Kraken,  Seattle Storm, Seattle Seawolves,  Seattle Sounders FC, and OL Reign.

Staff

Players

Current roster

Player and staff history

Head coach history

Offensive coordinator history

Defensive coordinator history

Former notable players 
 Michael Dunn - Current Cleveland Browns Offensive Lineman
 Godwin Igwebuike - Current Seattle Seahawks Running Back
 Steven Johnson - Former Denver Broncos Linebacker

Current notable players 

Ben DiNucci - Former Dallas Cowboys Quarterback, 2020 7th Round Pick
Jordan Evans - Former Cincinnati Bengals Linebacker, 2017 6th Round Pick
Josh Gordon - Former Cleveland Browns Wide Receiver, 2013 Pro Bowler, 2013 NFL Receiving Yards Leader, 2013 NFL First Team All-Pro
P. J. Hall - Former Oakland Raiders Defensive Tackle, 2018 2nd Round Pick

References

External links